The fasciated antshrike (Cymbilaimus lineatus) is a species of bird in the antbird family Thamnophilidae. The species is found in Central and Southern America.

Taxonomy and systematics
The species is very closely related to the bamboo antshrike, and the two have previously been considered to be the same species. As the entire range of that species is shared with the fasciated antshrike, however, the two are now treated as two species. The fasciated antshrike has three subspecies, ' the nominate subspecies, C. l. lineatus , C. l. fasciatus (Ridgway, 1884) and C. l. intermedius (Hartert & Goodson, 1917).

Distribution and range
It is found from eastern Honduras down to Colombia, the Amazon Basin and the Guyanas. Its natural habitat tropical moist lowland forests, in tangled and dense vegetation in the mid-story of the forest. It is more common in secondary forest in Central America. Where its range overlaps with that of the bamboo antshrike it is found at lower elevations than that species.

Description 
The plumage varies by sex (sexual dimorphism), with the male being black with white barring across the whole body. The barring is very faint on the crown and becomes more even further down the body. The crown is rufous on the female, and the rest of the body is brown bared with faint yellow-brown, become yellow-brown barred with brown further down the body. The bill is large and hooked.

The fasciated antshrike makes a variety of calls, including lazy plaintive whistles and a rattle-like chatter.

Behaviour

Diet and feeding
It particularly feeds on vine clusters and near tree trunks, but will also come down to the forest floor on occasion. Insects taken include grasshoppers, bugs, beetles and caterpillars, as well as spiders and even lizards, amphibians and occasionally fruit. They will join mixed species feeding flocks with antwrens and foliage-gleaners that pass through their territories, and will also follow army ants to take prey flushed by them, but they are not obligate ant-followers.

Breeding
Both parents incubate the eggs during the day, only the female does so at night.

References

fasciated antshrike
Birds of the Tumbes-Chocó-Magdalena
Birds of Costa Rica
Birds of Nicaragua
Birds of Panama
Birds of the Guianas
fasciated antshrike
Taxonomy articles created by Polbot